Arthington Viaduct,   listed known as the Wharfedale Viaduct, carries the Harrogate Line across the Wharfe valley between Arthington in West Yorkshire and Castley in North Yorkshire, England. It is a Grade II listed structure.

Construction was supervised by Chief Engineer of the Leeds and Thirsk Railway Thomas Grainger, who built the line from Leeds to Stockton-on-Tees via Harrogate and Thirsk. The foundation stone was laid on 31 March 1846 by Henry Cowper Marshall, Chairman of Leeds and Thirsk Railway Company and the line opened on 10 July 1849 when the nearby Bramhope Tunnel, another key component of the line, was complete. In excess of  50,000 tons of stone were used in its construction.

Dimensions 
Span of arch: 
Rise of arch: 
Greatest height: 
Lowest height: 
Length of viaduct: 
Width of roadway:

See also
Listed buildings in Arthington

References

Arthington Viaduct - Pool-in-Wharfedale History

Railway viaducts in North Yorkshire
Grade II listed buildings in West Yorkshire
Grade II listed buildings in North Yorkshire
Bridges completed in 1849
Wharfedale